The Pope's Exorcist is an upcoming American supernatural horror film directed by Julius Avery and starring Russell Crowe as Father Gabriele Amorth. The film also stars Daniel Zovatto, Alex Essoe and Franco Nero. It is based on Amorth's memoirs An Exorcist Tells His Story and An Exorcist: More Stories.

Production began in 2020 when Screen Gems bought the rights to Amorth's story. After a directorial replacement and script revisions, filming took place from August to October 2022 in Ireland. It is scheduled to be released in the United States on April 14, 2023, by Sony Pictures Releasing.

Cast

 Russell Crowe as Father Gabriele Amorth
 Daniel Zovatto
 Alex Essoe
 Franco Nero as The Pope
 Laurel Marsden
 Cornell S. John
 Peter DeSouza-Feighoney
 Ralph Ineson as Demon (voice)

Production

Development
In October 2020, Screen Gems acquired the rights to the story of Father Gabriele Amorth with Ángel Gómez hired to direct. Chester Hastings and R. Dean McCreary were attached to write the script, while Michael Patrick Kaczmarek, Jeff Katz, and Eddie Siebert were set to produce the film. In June 2022, Julius Avery boarded the film as director along with producer Doug Belgrad of 2.0 Entertainment.  Subsequent script revisions were provided by Michael Petroni and Evan Spiliotopoulos.

Casting
In June 2022, Russell Crowe was cast as Amorth. The following month, Alex Essoe and Daniel Zovatto joined the cast. In September, Franco Nero was cast as the Pope, while Laurel Marsden, Cornell S. John, and Peter DeSouza-Feighoney were added to the cast in undisclosed roles. Ralph Ineson voices the demon.

Filming
Principal photography took place from August to October 2022 in Dublin and Limerick, Ireland.  Scenes were filmed with Crowe in at the Trinity College in Dublin.

Release
The Pope's Exorcist is scheduled to be released in the United States on April 14, 2023, by Sony Pictures Releasing.

References

External links
 
 
 

Upcoming films
2023 films
2023 horror films
2020s American films
2020s English-language films
2020s supernatural horror films
American supernatural horror films
Films about Catholic priests
Films about exorcism
Films based on memoirs
Films based on multiple works of a series
Films directed by Julius Avery
Films produced by Doug Belgrad
Films scored by Jed Kurzel
Films shot in Dublin (city)
Films with screenplays by Michael Petroni
Films with screenplays by Evan Spiliotopoulos
Screen Gems films
Upcoming English-language films
Catholic Church in popular culture